The 1925 Tennessee Docs football team (variously "Docs", "UT Doctors" or the "Tennessee Medicos") represented the University of Tennessee College of Medicine in Memphis in the 1925 college football season.

Schedule

References

Tennessee Docs
Tennessee Docs football seasons
Tennessee Docs football